This is a list of films produced by the Tollywood (Telugu language film industry) based in Hyderabad in the year 1995.

List of released films

Dubbed films

References

1995
Telugu
 Telugu films
1995 in Indian cinema